"To Mistiko Mou Na Vreis" (Greek: Το μυστικό μου να βρεις; English: Find my secret) is the third single by the Greek Cypriot singer Ivi Adamou from her first album Kalokairi Stin Kardia, written by Adam Baptiste, Alex Papaconstantinou and Giannis Doxas. It was released on 10 June 2010.

Track listing
Digital download
"To Mistiko Mou Na Vreis" – 2:43

Credits and personnel
 Lead vocals – Ivi Adamou
 Producers – Alex Papaconstantinou
 Lyrics – Adam Baptiste, Alex Papaconstantinou, Giannis Doxas
 Label: Sony Music Greece/Day 1

Music video
A poll was held in August 2010 to find out which song would be Adamou's next single. The choice was between "Gelaei" and "To Mistiko Mou Na Vreis". It was announced on 30 August 2010 that the winner was "To Mistiko Mou Na Vreis". Filming of a video started in September 2010 and it was released on 15 November 2010.

The video was uploaded on 15 November 2010 to IviAdamouTV. The video was blocked by SME worldwide and it was unblocked in 2011. It was announced that it would be uploaded again on VEVO channel but it never was.

Release history

References

2010 singles
Ivi Adamou songs
Songs written by Giannis Doxas
2010 songs
Sony Music singles
Songs written by Alex P
Songs written by Adam Baptiste
Greek-language songs